Peter Safran (born 22 November 1965) is a British-American film producer and manager. He currently serves as the co-chairperson and CEO of DC Studios alongside James Gunn.

Early life
After growing up in the UK, Safran graduated from Princeton University. He earned his J.D. degree at the New York University School of Law. He worked as a corporate attorney in New York City, before becoming an assistant at UTA.

Film career
He became a manager at Gold-Miller Co and stayed there until 1998. He then was a manager at Brillstein-Grey for five years, before he was named president of Brillstein-Grey Management in 2003. As president, he was made responsible for day-to-day activities of the department, which had over 200 clients, including Brad Pitt, Jennifer Aniston, Adam Sandler, Nicolas Cage and Courteney Cox. He left Brillstein-Grey in 2006, to launch The Safran Company, and took his entire client list with him. As manager, he represented Sean Combs, Adam Shankman, David Hyde Pierce, Jennifer Lopez, and Brooke Shields.

During the last few years Safran has been able to build upon The Conjuring Universe and produce films such as Aquaman, Shazam!, The Suicide Squad, Shazam! Fury of the Gods and Peacemaker television series, with others under his banner and through his first-look deal with Warner Bros.

In October 2022, Safran and James Gunn were named co-chairs and co-CEOs of DC Studios, overseeing film, television and animation projects. While Gunn will handle the creative aspects, Safran will handle the business side of the division. The two assumed their positions on November 1, 2022.

Filmography

Film

Producer
Warner Bros.

Other studios

Executive producer

Short films

Television

References

External links
 
 Safran Digital Group

1965 births
Living people
English emigrants to the United States
Princeton University alumni
New York University School of Law alumni
American film producers
American film studio executives
Warner Bros. people